Battle for Ozzfest is a reality TV show that aired during autumn 2004 on MTV, where eight bands 'battle' it out in a series of challenges to win a spot on the stage of the metal festival Ozzfest, which is a primarily heavy metal-subgenre based music festival. The series lasted 12 episodes, the winner being decided by online voters.

Cast
{|
|-
|

References

External links

2000s American reality television series
2004 American television series debuts
2005 American television series endings
MTV original programming
Ozzfest